The Toter Mann ("Dead Man") is a mountain,  high, in the Southern Black Forest in Baden-Württemberg.  It lies southeast of Freiburg im Breisgau in the municipality of Oberried.

References 

One-thousanders of Germany
Mountains and hills of the Black Forest